Bourley and Long Valley is a  biological Site of Special Scientific Interest between Fleet and Aldershot in Hampshire. It is part of Thames Basin Heaths Special Protection Area for the conservation of wild birds.

This site has varied habitats, with heath, woodland, scrub, mire and grassland. The heathland is important for three vulnerable birds, woodlarks, nightjars and Dartford warblers. There is a rich invertebrate fauna, including the nationally scarce Eumenes coarctatus potter wasp, silver-studded blue butterfly and downy emerald dragonfly.

References

 
Sites of Special Scientific Interest in Hampshire
Special Protection Areas in England